Girl in the Case is a 1934 American romantic comedy film. Directed by Eugene Frenke, the film tars Jimmy Savo, Eddie Lambert, and Dorothy Darling. It was released on March 15, 1934.

Cast list
 Jimmy Savo
 Eddie Lambert 
 Dorothy Darling 
 Arthur Loft
 Si Jenks
 M. Ivanoff
 Arthur Thallassoff Schultz

References

American black-and-white films
American romantic comedy films
1934 romantic comedy films
1934 films
Films directed by Eugene Frenke
1930s American films
1930s English-language films
Films scored by Oliver Wallace